Ivanhoe is a 1952 British-American historical adventure epic film directed by Richard Thorpe and produced by Pandro S. Berman for Metro-Goldwyn-Mayer. The film was shot in Technicolor, with a cast featuring Robert Taylor, Elizabeth Taylor, Joan Fontaine, George Sanders, Emlyn Williams, Finlay Currie, and Felix Aylmer. The screenplay is written by Æneas MacKenzie, Marguerite Roberts, and Noel Langley, based on the 1819 historical novel Ivanhoe by Sir Walter Scott.

The film was the first in what turned out to be an unofficial trilogy made by the same director, producer, and star (Robert Taylor). The others were Knights of the Round Table (1953) and The Adventures of Quentin Durward (1955). All three were made at MGM-British Studios at Borehamwood, Herts, near London.

In 1951, the year of production, one of the screenwriters, Marguerite Roberts, was blacklisted by the House Un-American Activities Committee, and MGM received permission from the Screen Writers Guild to remove her credit from the film, which has since been restored.

Plot
Richard the Lionheart, the Norman King of England, vanishes while returning from the Crusades. One of his knights, the Saxon Wilfred of Ivanhoe, searches for him, finally finding him being held by Leopold of Austria for an enormous ransom. Richard's treacherous brother, Prince John, knows about it but does nothing, enjoying ruling in his absence.

Back in England, Ivanhoe, pretending to be a minstrel, meets Sir Brian de Bois-Guilbert and Sir Hugh de Bracy, two of Prince John's Norman supporters. When the Norman party seeks shelter for the night, Ivanhoe leads them to Rotherwood, the home of his father, Cedric the Saxon. Cedric welcomes the knights coldly while Ivanhoe sneaks into the chamber of the Lady Rowena, Cedric's ward, and they kiss. Later, in private, Ivanhoe pleads with Cedric to aid in raising the ransom of 150,000 marks of silver to free Richard, but Cedric wants no part of helping any Norman. When Ivanhoe leaves, Wamba, Cedric's jester, asks to go with him and is made his squire. Later, the two men rescue the Jew, Isaac of York, another guest of Cedric's, from two Norman soldiers. Shaken, Isaac decides to return home to Sheffield. Ivanhoe escorts him there. Isaac's daughter Rebecca gives Ivanhoe jewels, without her father's knowledge, to buy a horse and armour for an important jousting tournament at Ashby.

Many nobles are at the tournament, including Prince John. The Norman knights Brian de Bois-Guilbert, Hugh de Bracy, Front de Boeuf, Philip de Malvoisin and Ralph de Vipont defeat all Saxon comers. Then a mysterious Saxon knight appears, arrayed all in black, his face hidden behind his helm. He declines to reveal his name, but challenges all five Normans. He easily defeats Malvoisin, Vipont and Front de Boeuf, one after the other. When Ivanhoe salutes Rebecca, Bois-Guilbert is immediately smitten by her beauty. While Ivanhoe bests Bracy, he is seriously wounded in the shoulder. By this point, his identity has been guessed by his father and Robin Hood. In the last bout against Bois-Guilbert, Ivanhoe falls from his horse. He is carried off, to be tended to by Rebecca.

Ivanhoe is taken to the woods under the protection of Robin Hood. The other Saxons make for the city of York, but are captured and taken to the castle of Front de Boeuf. When Ivanhoe hears the news, he gives himself up in exchange for his father's freedom. However, Bois-Guilbert treacherously keeps them both. Robin Hood's men storm the castle. In the fighting, Front de Boeuf drives Wamba to his death in a burning part of the castle and is slain in turn by Ivanhoe. The defence crumbles. Bois-Guilbert alone escapes, using Rebecca as a human shield; de Bracy is captured when he attempts to do the same with Rowena.

The enormous ransom is finally collected, but the Jews face a cruel choice: free either Richard or Rebecca, for Prince John has set the price of her life at 100,000 marks, the Jews' contribution. Isaac chooses Richard. Cedric takes the ransom to Leopold of Austria, while Ivanhoe promises Isaac that he will rescue Rebecca.

At Rebecca's trial, she is condemned to be burned at the stake as a witch, but Ivanhoe appears and challenges the verdict, invoking the right to "wager of battle". Prince John chooses Bois-Guilbert as the court's champion. Bois-Guilbert makes a last, desperate plea to Rebecca, offering to forfeit the duel in return for her love, though he would be forever disgraced. She refuses, saying, "We are all in God's hands, sir knight".

In the duel, Ivanhoe is unhorsed, but manages to pull Bois-Guilbert from his horse and mortally wound him with a battle axe. As he lies dying, Bois-Guilbert tells Rebecca that it is he who loves her, not Ivanhoe. Rebecca acknowledges this to Rowena.

King Richard and his knights arrive to reclaim his throne. Prince John grudgingly kneels before his brother. Richard then calls on his kneeling people to rise, not as Normans or Saxons, but as Englishmen.

Cast

 Robert Taylor as Ivanhoe
 Elizabeth Taylor as Rebecca
 Joan Fontaine as Rowena
 George Sanders as De Bois-Guilbert
 Emlyn Williams as Wamba - and Narrator (uncredited)
 Robert Douglas as Sir Hugh de Bracy
 Finlay Currie as Cedric
 Felix Aylmer as Isaac
 Francis De Wolff as Front de Boeuf 
 Norman Wooland as King Richard
 Basil Sydney as Waldemar Fitzurse
 Harold Warrender as Locksley/Robin Hood
 Patrick Holt as Philip de Malvoisin
 Roderick Lovell as Ralph de Vipont
 Sebastian Cabot as Clerk of Copmanhurst
 John Ruddock as Hundebert
 Michael Brennan as Baldwin
 Megs Jenkins as Servant to Isaac
 Valentine Dyall as Norman Guard
 Lionel Harris as Roger of Bermondsley
 Carl Jaffe as Austrian Monk
 Guy Rolfe as Prince John
 May Hallatt as Elgitha (uncredited)
 Robert Brown as Castle Guard at Torquilstone (uncredited)
 Martin Benson as Jewish Delegate (uncredited)
 Jack Churchill as Archer on the walls of Torquilstone (uncredited)

Production
In 1951, the film's main scriptwriter, Marguerite Roberts, was ordered to appear before the House Un-American Activities Committee, where she and her husband, John Sanford, cited the Fifth Amendment and refused to answer questions about whether they had been members of the American Communist Party. Consequently, they were both blacklisted, and MGM received permission from the Screen Writers Guild to remove Roberts' credit from the film. It would take nine years before she was allowed to work in Hollywood again. Roberts had already completed another screenplay for an MGM film, The Girl Who Had Everything. It was released early in 1953, but she wasn't credited.

Scenes were filmed on soundstages at MGM-British Studios, Borehamwood, Herts, and on location at Doune Castle, Scotland. Both the Ashby-de-la-Zouch tournament and the Torquilstone Castle siege were shot on the large Borehamwood backlot. Woodland scenes were shot in Ashridge Forest, Herts and Bucks. The studio hired Jack Churchill, a British Second World War army officer (renowned for going into battle carrying a Scottish broadsword, longbow and bagpipes), to appear as an archer, shooting from the walls of Warwick Castle.

Music
Miklós Rózsa's score is one of his most highly regarded, and it received both Academy Award and Golden Globe nominations. However, the composer was deeply disappointed with the film's treatment of Scott's novel, as he explained in his 1982 autobiography:

In an interview with Bruce Duffie in 1987 Rózsa identified some of these medieval sources:

The various themes in Ivanhoe are partly based on authentic Twelfth Century music, or at least influenced by them. Under the opening narration I introduced a theme from a ballad actually written by Richard the Lionhearted. The principle Norman theme I developed from a Latin hymn by the troubadour Giraut de Bornelh. This appears the first time with the approaching Normans in Sherwood Forest. Later during the film it undergoes various contrapuntal treatments. The love theme for Ivanhoe and Rowena is a free adaptation of an old popular song from the north of France. The manuscript of this I found in a collection of songs in the Royal Library of Brussels. It's a lovely melody, breathing the innocently amorous atmosphere of the middle ages, and I gave it modal harmonizations. Rebecca needed a Jewish theme, reflecting not only the tragedy of this beautiful character but also the persecution of her race. Fragments of medieval Jewish motives suggested a melody to me. My most difficult job was the scoring of the extensive battle in the castle because the producers wanted music to accompany almost all of it. I devised a new theme for the Saxons, along with a motive for the battering ram sequence, thereby giving a rhythmic beat which contrapuntally and polytonally worked out with the previous thematic material, forming a tonal background to this exciting battle scene. Scoring battles in films is very difficult, and sadly one for which the composer seldom gets much credit. The visuals and the emotional excitement are so arresting that the viewer tends not to be aware that he or she is also being influenced by what is heard.

Rózsa was, however, mistaken or misremembering if he believed the Giraut de Bornelh melody he used was a "Latin hymn". While Reis glorios, verais lums e clartatz opens by invoking the divine ("Glorious King, true light and clarity"), it is a secular Occitan alba or dawn-song, in which the narrator is keeping guard while his friend is spending the night with another man's wife or mistress.

Reception

Box office
Ivanhoe was released in the summer of 1952. It opened at the Radio City Music Hall in New York City on July 31 and set an opening week record at the Hall with a gross of $177,000. In its opening 39 days, the film took $1,310,590 at the box office, setting a new record for an MGM film. According to the studio records, it made $5,810,000 in the US and Canada and $5,086,000 elsewhere, resulting in a profit of $2,762,000. It was MGM's biggest earner for 1952 and one of the top four money-makers of the year. It was also the fourth most popular film in England in 1952.

Critical reception
Pandro S. Berman, Freddie Young, and Miklós Rózsa were nominated for Academy Awards, for Best Picture, Best Cinematography, Color, and Best Music, Scoring, respectively. In addition, Richard Thorpe was nominated by the Directors Guild of America, USA, for Outstanding Directorial Achievement in Motion Pictures. There were also two Golden Globe Award nominations: Best Film Promoting International Understanding and Best Motion Picture Score, for Miklós Rózsa.

Bosley Crowther, film critic for The New York Times, wrote that "producer Pandro S. Berman and Metro-Goldwyn-Mayer have fetched a motion picture that does them, Scott and English history proud" and delivered "almost as fine a panorama of medievalism as Laurence Olivier gave us in Henry V".

Differences from Scott's novel
 The film omits the characters Gurth the Swineherd, Athelstane of Coningsburgh, Ulrica of Torquilstone, Lucas Beaumanoir (Grand Master of the Templars) and Prior Aymer of Jorvaulx, while it introduces a company of crusaders who do not appear in the novel. Ivanhoe's early injuries are rapidly healed, and he plays a very active part during the siege of Torquilstone Castle. Unlike the novel, King Richard is not involved until the final scene, when he and his crusader knights ride in. In the novel, Rebecca is tried and sentenced by the Templars, not by Prince John.
 At the beginning of the novel, Ivanhoe has arrived in England disguised as a palmer, a pilgrim returning from Palestine. In the film he is posing as a troubadour.
 In the film, Ivanhoe surreptitiously kills two Normans during the siege of Torquilstone. He stabs a sentry in the back with a dagger and shoots a squire in the back with a crossbow bolt. Nothing similar happens in the novel, in which Ivanhoe is the epitome of chivalry—in Chaucer's phrase, "a very perfect gentle knight". Both incidents were dropped from the comic book versions.
 De Bois-Guilbert is represented as a Norman knight, not as a Knight Templar. The Templars were military monks, bound by a rule of celibacy. There is no reference to the Templars in the film.
 De Bois-Guilbert is killed by Ivanhoe in the film, rather than of natural causes in the novel.
 In the film, like de Bois-Guilbert, de Bracy is a Norman knight who has returned from the Crusades. In the novel, he is one of Prince John's mercenaries or Free Companions.
 Ivanhoe assumes the role of the Black Knight (the disguised King Richard in the novel) as well as the Disinherited Knight. He also assumes the role of the minstrel Blondel, the legendary discoverer of the location of King Richard's imprisonment, who does not appear in the novel.
 In the film, a ransom is collected for Richard. When the novel opens, Richard has already been ransomed.
 Wamba (in whom the book's characters of Wamba and Gurth are combined) does not die in the novel, but does in the film.
 In the novel, Locksley is revealed to be Robin Hood and the Clerk of Copmanhurst Friar Tuck. In the film, their true identities are never mentioned. In fact, the clerk appears as a layman, not a churchman. However, Sebastian Cabot's clerk is made up to resemble the Friar Tuck played by Willard Louis in the 1922 film Robin Hood, starring Douglas Fairbanks.

Comic book adaptions
 Fawcett Movie Comic #20 (December 1952). 32 pages in full color plus covers, artist unknown.
 Sun (weekly comic magazine, Amalgamated Press, London) #177, 28 June 1952 - #197, 15 November 1952. 21 issues, 42 pages in full colour. Drawn by Patrick Nicolle.

See also
 List of American films of 1952

References

External links
 
 
 
 
 

1952 films
1950s adventure drama films
American adventure drama films
1950s English-language films
American swashbuckler films
Robin Hood films
Films based on Ivanhoe
Films set in the 12th century
Films set in country houses
Metro-Goldwyn-Mayer films
Films directed by Richard Thorpe
Films produced by Pandro S. Berman
Films scored by Miklós Rózsa
Films adapted into comics
Cultural depictions of Richard I of England
Cultural depictions of John, King of England
1952 drama films
Films with screenplays by Noel Langley
Films shot at MGM-British Studios
1950s American films